North Canal Township Park (also known locally as 'The Breakers') is a park across the Keweenaw Waterway from McLain State Park near Houghton, Michigan.  It covers 177 acres and has several rustic campsites.  The park features a breakwater which protects the Keweenaw Waterway.  Stamp sand from old copper stamp mills to the southwest of the park have accumulated at the breaker and was recently restored to a more natural appearance by covering the sand with topsoil

There is a No Camping sign posted on the old campground and police kick out everyone after 11 pm.

External links
 Information about park on Keweenaw Free Guide
 Breakers to bay 5mi road race - A road race that starts at North Canal Township Park

Protected areas of Houghton County, Michigan
Parks in Michigan